"Anne" is the third season premiere of the WB Television Network's drama television series Buffy the Vampire Slayer. It was written and directed by series creator Joss Whedon, and first broadcast on September 29, 1998. The episode marks a significant emotional journey for Buffy as she has cast off her slayer identity along with her friends in Sunnydale. In the episode, Buffy - living a secluded life away from her previous life - helps some unknown strangers find their lost loved ones. Meanwhile, Buffy has to decide whether she is ready to find herself again. This episode forms part of a larger study of personal and alternate identities which characterises all seven seasons of the show.

Plot 
Due to her expulsion from school, the deaths of her lover Angel and friend and fellow Slayer Kendra Young, being accused of murder in the latter's death, and being kicked out by her mother, Joyce, Buffy has left Sunnydale and moved to Los Angeles where she works as a diner waitress under her middle name, "Anne". In the diner, Buffy serves Lily and Rickie, a young couple living on the streets, who have just gotten a complementary set of distinctive tattoos. As Buffy walks the street a homeless woman is muttering she is no-one. Later that evening Lily approaches Buffy and reveals that she remembers her from Sunnydale and a time when Lily was known as "Chanterelle". As they talk, a man bumps through and mutters that he is no-one as he walks out into traffic and is nearly hit by a car, only saved by Buffy's quick response. Buffy encounters a man named Ken, who comments on her "lost" state and offers to befriend her.

The next day Lily tells Buffy that Rickie has disappeared. Buffy reluctantly agrees to help find him. In her search, she finds the body of an elderly homeless man with Rickie's tattoo. Buffy reports her findings to Lily, who does not believe that the body could be Rickie's. On the street Lily meets Ken, who claims to know Rickie, so she eagerly goes with him. Buffy interrogates a blood bank worker who has been acting suspiciously, and learns that the woman has been giving Ken the names of healthy homeless people who come in to donate blood.

Back in Sunnydale, Willow, Xander and Oz struggle to cover for Buffy in her Slayer duties, and reluctantly resort to using Cordelia as bait in their next stakeout mission. After returning from an unsuccessful lead on Buffy's location in Oakland, Giles visits Joyce, who is now suffering from agoraphobia after learning of Buffy's Slayer life. Joyce blames Giles for taking her daughter away from her.

Meanwhile, Ken has prepared a hesitant Lily for a "cleansing", which entails stepping into a bath of black oil in the floor. At the door, Buffy attempts to pass herself off as a sinner wanting a new chance, but ends up kicking her way into the building in time to see Lily dragged into the pool. Buffy and Ken wrestle and they both fall in, coming out below in a huge factory. Ken's human mask falls off, revealing him to be a demon. Buffy and Lily are now amongst many other slave laborers of varying ages. Ken tells Buffy and Lily that they are in a hell dimension where time passes very quickly: a hundred years there equals only one day in Los Angeles. Since he only picks people who no one will miss, they will have worked themselves to a used-up death of old age without anyone noticing their absence. He tells Lily that Rickie remembered her, even after he had forgotten his own name. Lily resigns herself to ending up in hell, and accepts her fate passively.

Ken lines the captives up and each one is asked, "Who are you?" and then bludgeoned unless they deny their existence. When it is Buffy's turn, she says her name with pride and a battle ensues until Ken threatens Lily at knifepoint. Ken delivers a speech, but Lily pushes him off the ledge onto a concrete floor. Lily then leads the captives back up through the pool as Buffy dispatches Ken. Once all of the humans are out of the demonic dimension, the pool gateway closes.

Back in her apartment, Buffy packs her bag, ready to return to Sunnydale. She gives Lily her "Anne" identity. On her arrival back at the family home, Buffy is embraced by her relieved mother.

Reception

Noel Murray of The A.V. Club described "Anne" as "a very clever meditation on adolescent identity". The scene where Anne asserts her identity as Buffy was frequently used as a promotional clip for reruns of the series on the FX channel.

References

External links 

 

Buffy the Vampire Slayer (season 3) episodes
1998 American television episodes
Television episodes written by Joss Whedon
Television episodes directed by Joss Whedon
Television episodes about child abduction
Television episodes set in Los Angeles
Television episodes about human trafficking